
Oława County is a unit of territorial administration and local government (powiat) in Lower Silesian Voivodeship, south-western Poland. It was created on January 1, 1999 as a result of the Polish local government reforms passed in 1998. Its administrative seat is the town of Oława, and its only other town is Jelcz-Laskowice.

As of 2019 the total population of the county is 76,723, out of which the population of Oława is 33,029,
that of Jelcz-Laskowice is 15,803, and the rural population is 27,891.

Neighbouring counties
Oława County is bordered by Oleśnica County to the north, Namysłów County and Brzeg County to the east, Strzelin County to the south-west, and Wrocław County to the north-west.

Administrative division
The county is subdivided into four gminas (one urban, one urban-rural and two rural). These are listed in the following table, in descending order of population.

References

 
Land counties of Lower Silesian Voivodeship